"Good Morning" is a single by American singer Lionel Richie. It was written by Tricky Stewart, Teriush "The-Dream" Nash, James Button, and Corron Cole for Richie's ninth studio album Just Go (2009), while production was helmed by Stewart, Button and Cole, with The-Dream credited as a co-producer. The song was released as the album's lead single in 2008. It reached number 67 on the German Albums Chart.

Track listing

Notes
 signifies a co-producer

Charts

References

2008 singles
Lionel Richie songs
Song recordings produced by Tricky Stewart
Songs written by Tricky Stewart
Songs written by The-Dream
2008 songs